Greater Danbury, also known as the Housatonic Valley Region, is a region in the state of Connecticut centered on the city of Danbury. It consists of the city of Danbury and adjacent towns in the areas around the Housatonic River and the Still River. The area is also home to  Candlewood Lake, the largest lake in the New York metropolitan area.

Definitions

New England City and Town Area
The U.S. Census Bureau defines the metropolitan area of Danbury as the Danbury Metropolitan NECTA. It consists of the city of Danbury plus the towns of Bethel, Bridgewater, Brookfield, New Fairfield, New Milford, Newtown, Roxbury, and Sherman for a total of 9 municipalities. As of 2019, the population of the Danbury NECTA was 193,427.

Western Connecticut Region
The Danbury NECTA is located within the area administered by the Western Connecticut Council of Governments, and is part of the Housatonic Valley Metropolitan Planning Organization.

Danbury Labor Market Area
As defined by the Bureau of Labor Statistics, the labor market area of Danbury includes the towns in the Housatonic Valley Region plus the towns of Roxbury and Washington for a total of twelve towns.

List of Municipalities
Municipalities within the area known as "Greater Danbury", include:
Bethel
Bridgewater
Brookfield
Danbury
New Fairfield
New Milford
Newtown
Redding
Ridgefield
Sherman
Southeast, New York

References

External links
Housatonic Valley Council of Elected Officials
Greater Danbury Chamber of Commerce

Metropolitan areas of Connecticut
New York metropolitan area
Regions of Connecticut
Geography of Danbury, Connecticut